Waverly, founded in 1836, is the second largest city in Morgan County, Illinois, United States. The population was 1,307 at the 2010 census. It is part of the Jacksonville Micropolitan Statistical Area.  The town was named after the Waverley novels of Sir Walter Scott. Waverly is also the home of the Waverly Holiday Tournament, the longest running Class 1A holiday basketball tournament in the state of Illinois, for high school boys' basketball in December every year since 1951.

Geography

Waverly is the geographical center of the Illinois Community College District #526, which is served by Lincoln Land Community College.

Demographics

The estimated median household income in 2019: $51,630, $36,111 in 2000. The estimated per capita income in 2019: $25,548, $18,205 in 2000. The estimated median house or condo value in 2019: $83,532, $56,400 in 2000. The percentage of residents living in poverty in 2019: 7.6%. 40.1% of students that attend Waverly Community Schools, CUSD #6, are listed as low income students: students eligible to receive free or reduced-price lunches, live in substitute care, or whose families receive public aid.

Notable people
 Herk Harvey, film director, Carnival of Souls; lived in Waverly
 Ralph C. Smedley, founder of Toastmasters International

References

Cities in Morgan County, Illinois
Cities in Illinois
Jacksonville, Illinois micropolitan area
1836 establishments in Illinois